John David Maloney (born January 5, 1945) is a Canadian politician. He was a member of the House of Commons of Canada 1993 to 2008, and represented the riding of Welland and its antecedents for the Liberal Party, and subsequently served as mayor of Port Colborne from 2014 to 2018.

Maloney has a Bachelor of Arts degree and a Diploma in Criminology from the University of Toronto, as well as a law degree from Osgoode Hall. He practiced law before entering political life. Maloney worked for the firm of Smith, Shaver, Selzer & McLuskie from 1972 to 1974, operated a private practice in Port Colborne from 1974 to 1976, and has been a partner in Maloney and Maloney from 1976 to the present. In 1980, he was named Port Colborne Citizen of the Year. He received a Queen's Jubilee Medal in 2002.

He was first elected to parliament in the 1993 federal election, winning a convincing victory over his Reform and Progressive Conservative opponents in the riding of Erie. He was re-elected by narrower margins in the elections of 1997 and 2000, in the redistributed riding of Erie—Lincoln. On the latter occasion, he defeated Canadian Alliance candidate and future MP Dean Allison by just over 2,000 votes.

After further redistribution in 2004, Maloney defeated Greg D'Amico and fellow Liberal MP Tony Tirabassi for the party's nomination in Welland. He defeated New Democratic Party candidate Jody Di Bartolomeo and Conservative Mel Grunstein in the election which followed. In the 2006 federal election, he once again defeated Bartolomeo and Grunstein and was returned to office by the voters of Welland.

Maloney served as parliamentary secretary to Canada's Attorney General from 1999 to 2001.

He was defeated in the 2008 federal election, finishing third against New Democratic Party candidate Malcolm Allen. In early 2009, Maloney was again acclaimed as the Liberal Party candidate for the next federal election, held May 2, 2011. Maloney again lost to incumbent, Malcolm Allen.

In April 2014, Maloney announced his filing to run for the office of Mayor of Port Colborne in the 2014 municipal elections. Maloney went on to win the mayoral race in October 2014, with 3,991 (57.5%) votes over candidates Fred Davies at 2,258 votes (32.5%), and Mike Sloat at 693 votes (10%).

He did not seek re-election in the 2018 municipal elections.

Electoral record

|}

|}

|}

References

External links 
 

1945 births
Liberal Party of Canada MPs
Living people
Members of the House of Commons of Canada from Ontario
Lawyers in Ontario
People from Welland
University of Toronto alumni
Osgoode Hall Law School alumni
21st-century Canadian politicians